Anna Wasilewska (10 January 1958 – 6 April 2021) was a Polish politician. She was deputy marshal in the Warmian-Masurian Voivodeship. Wasilewska was elected to the Sejm in 2015 and 2019. She served as a member of the Polish Sejm for the 35th district from 2015 until her death.

References

1958 births
2021 deaths
Members of the Polish Sejm 2019–2023
Members of the Polish Sejm 2015–2019